Tidestromia lanuginosa is a species of flowering plant in the family Amaranthaceae known by the common name woolly tidestromia.

Range and habitat
It is native to the southwestern United States and northern to central Mexico, where it grows in many types of habitat, including desert canyons and woodlands, desert riparian zones, desert and coastal scrub, beaches, and disturbed habitat such as roadsides.

Growth pattern
It is an annual herb producing a sprawling red, yellow, or greenish stem up to 50 centimeters long, or occasionally longer, to form clumps or patches on the ground.

Leaves and stem
The leaves are quite variable in shape, being rounded to lance-shaped and sometimes asymmetrical. They are gray-green in color due to a thin to dense layer of hairs. The hairs gradually wear off on the upper surface revealing the green below. Stems are red and are also covered with white hairs.

Flowers and fruit
Flowers occur in the leaf axils in clusters of a few, or solitary. The flower lacks petals but has tiny sepals around a ring of five stamens.

The plant blooms July to October.

References

External links
Jepson Manual Treatment
Flora of North America

Amaranthaceae